Zinc finger CCHC-type containing 18 (ZCCHC18) is a protein that in humans is encoded by ZCCHC18 gene. It is also known as Smad-interacting zinc finger protein 2 (SIZN2), para-neoplastic Ma antigen family member 7b (PNMA7B), and LOC644353. Other names such as zinc finger, CCHC domain containing 12 pseudogene 1, P0CG32, ZCC18_HUMAN had been used to describe this protein.

ZCCHC18 belongs to the ZCCHC12 family or para-neoplastic Ma (PNMA). It is a ligand-dependent nuclear receptor transcription coactivator. Its zinc finger domain is CCHC which binds to zinc ion (see protein section for detail information on CCHC motif).

It is worthwhile to mention that in mammals, PNMA is derived from Ty3/Gypsy long terminal repeat (LTR) retrotransposons and PNMA family encodes the Gag-like protein.  Although the full functions remain unknown, most PNMA genes are expressed in brains of macaques and mice. PNMA1, 2 and 3 were found in the serum of patients with paraneoplastic neurological disorders. The family also includes modulator of apoptosis 1, having a role in death receptor-dependent apoptosis.

Gene

Location 
ZCCHC18 gene locates at the long arm of X chromosome, loci position Xq22.2. This gene contains 3 exons and 2 distinct gt-ag introns, being transcribed into 3 alternatively spliced mRNAs. However, only one spliced mRNA (NM_001143978.2, 2951 bp) putatively encodes a 403 amino acid protein, whereas the others does not encode proteins.

Gene Neighborhood 
Nearby genes include SLC25A53 (on the negative strand) (about 8,000 bit/s upstream) and FAM199X (on the positive strand) (about 50,800 bit/s downstream).

Expression 
ZCCHC18 ubiquitously expresses in ovary, brain (cerebellum), endometrium, lymph node, spleen and 22 other tissues in human and other species. Based on RNA-Seq expression data from GTEx (53 tissues from 570 donors), highest median expression is in brain—cerebellum (4.74 RPKM) whereas the total median expression of 67.54 RPKM.

Promoter 
Possible transcription binding sites is analyzed by Genomatix, listed in the table below:

Homology

Orthologs 
Orthologs  of ZCCHC18 can be found in most Chordata (Mammalia, Amphibian, Reptilian, Osteichthyes, but not in Arthropod, Aves, Chondrichthyes), Echinoderm, and Cnidarian but not in Fungus, Plant, Ciliates, Archaea, nor Bacteria.

Paralogs 
Eight possible paralogs of ZCCHC18 were identified in Homo sapiens.

Note: PNMA4 (aliases: modulator of apoptosis 1, MOAP1) does not appear to be similar to ZCCHC18 (the identity and similarity between ZCCHC18 and MOAP1 are 15% and 32.1%, respectively).

Transcript

Splice Variants 

Including 5’-UTR and 3’-UTR, ZCCHC18 spans from chrX:104,112,526-104,115,846 with a total of 3,321 base pairs (bps) (5’-UTR: 1206 bit/s and 3’-UTR: 523 bit/s). It contains 3 exons and 2 distinct gt-ag introns, being transcribed into 3 alternatively spliced mRNAs. However, only one spliced mRNA (NM_001143978.2, 2951 bit/s) putatively encodes a protein with 403 amino acids (coding region: hg38 chrX:104,114,112-104,115,323, total 1,212 bit/s), whereas others do not encode proteins.

Comparing to human ZCCHC18 mRNA which there are 3 isoforms, there are 7 isoforms of Zcchc18 in mouse (Mus musculus), and no isoform in cat (Felis catus) and leopard (Panthera pardus).

Protein 
ZCCHC18 is a human protein with 403 amino acids in length and has a predicted molecular weight of 45,160 daltons. Its basal isoelectric point is 7.02 (unphosphorylated state), and isoelectric point decreased with increased number of residues being phosphorylated. The common sequences of ZCCHC18 include KRED and LVIFM. It is generally electroneutral (there are no positive or negative charge clusters or segments) with no high hydrophobic segments.

Secondary Structure 

Secondary structure prediction of a not well-characterized protein can be performed by using PRBI database, Phyre2, and I-TASSER. The secondary structure prediction of ZCCHC18 was analyzed by Phyre2.

Tertiary Structure 
The tertiary structure was predicted by I-TASSER in the attempt to optimize C-score, TM-score, and cluster density. The predicted ZCCHC18 tertiary structure is shown in the figure..

Post-Translational Modifications 

The predicted post-translational modifications (PTMs) is obtained by using Prosite, and many other tools. The key post translation modifications are summarized here.

Subcellular Localization 
ZCCHC18 primary locates in the nucleus (appearance to be nuclear speck, a discrete extra-nucleolar subnuclear domain, under immunofluorescence microscopy).

Function 

Although the exact function of ZCCHC18 is still not fully known, the basic amino acid sequence of the zinc finger (Znf) CCHC-type protein can be well characterized as conservatively spaced cysteine and histidine. The Cys and His residues is completely conserved at position 1 (Cys), 4 (Cys), 9 (His), and 14 (Cys) [as the first Cys of the sequence labeled as Cys (1)]. Conservatively substituted glycines occur at position 5 and 8, and aromatic or hydrophobic amino acids are at positions 2 (or 3) and 10.  This motif is often expressed as Cys-X2-Cys-X4-His-X4-Cys.

The structure of zinc finger domains enables the protein to make tandem contact with target molecules through multiple finger-like protrusions. These domains can bind to zinc or other metals such as iron, or even no metal (stabilizing through salt bridges). The exact mechanism for how the Znf domain of ZCCHC18 work is still unknown.

Interacting Proteins 

ZCCHC18 can possibly interact with the intracellular domain of EGFR. This report was based on the two protein-protein interaction (PPI) approaches, the membrane yeast two-hybrid (MYTH) and the mammalian membrane two-hybrid (MMTH), to map the PPIs between human receptor tyrosine kinases (RTKs) and phosphatases.

Clinical Significance

Disease Association 

By examining RNA-seq data from The Cancer Genome Atlas (TCGA), glioma has enhanced RNA expression (median 1.9 FPKM [Fragments Per Kilobase of exon per Million reads]) whereas other cancer types only have minimal expression (median expression level lower than 0.5 FPKM). In terms of the ZCCHC18 protein expression, squamous and basal cell carcinomas, and cases of urothelial cancers exhibited moderate to strong cytoplasmic immunoreactivity. Remaining cancer cells were weakly stained or negative. While interrogating 4440 tumor samples from 15 cancer types from TCGA, the analysis showed a vary protein mutation frequency in different cancer types. ZCCHC18 mutation happened frequently in endometrial cancer (~ 2.4%), followed by bladder cancer (~0.8%), head/neck carcinoma (~0.4%), ovarian cancer (~0.4%), and breast cancer (<0.2%).

Genetic Testing 
As of May 2021, Fulgent Genetics was the only commercial company that provided the genetic testing for deletion or duplication of ZCCHC18 through sequence analysis of the entire coding region (Next-Generation Sequencing) for possible diseases caused by mutations on this particular gene that are inherited from a parent's genome. However, the clinical validity and utility have not been proven yet.

References